Pedro de Alcántara Téllez-Girón, 9th Duke of Osuna, Grandee of Spain (in full), (8 August 1755 – 7 January 1807), was a Spanish nobleman. He led Spanish troops during the French Revolutionary Wars.

Biography

Family
After April 1787, when his father, the 8th Duke, Pedro Zoilo Téllez Girón y de Guzmán (27 June 1728 – 1 April 1787) died, he was a co-founder of a society for the promotion of national cultural consciousness, known as Sociedad Económica de Amigos del País (Madrid branch). His mother was really named María Vicenta Tellez-Girón (born 28 July 1735 – died ????), but even so he is known as a Pacheco, perhaps because of the extensive family connections between Téllez-Giróns and Pachecos since the 15th century.

In 1772, he married María Josefa Pimentel, 12th Countess-Duchess of Benavente. She was 15th Countess of Benavente, Grandee of Spain, 13th Duchess of Béjar, Duchess of Arcos, Duchess of Gandía and Duchess of Monteagudo, Princess of Esquilache and Marquise of Lombay, whose possessions and noble titles were absorbed thereto by the Osuna family.

Military career
Téllez-Girón held important commands during the War of the Pyrenees which began on 7 March 1793 and ended with the Peace of Basel on 22 July 1795. As a Lieutenant General, he commanded a column under Captain General Antonio Ricardos in the Battle of Mas Deu in the eastern Pyrenees on 19 May 1793. Soon after the battle, he transferred out of Ricardos' Army of Catalonia. He later fought in the western Pyrenees. In the fall of 1794, he was placed in charge of the defense of Navarre. The Army of the western Pyrenees under French General Bon-Adrien Jeannot de Moncey defeated his badly outnumbered troops in the Battle of Orbaitzeta in October 1794, though he was able to keep the French from capturing the city of Pamplona.

Portraits
In a famous portrait, Goya portrays the Duke of Osuna without any medals in front of a dark background. The only indication of his military background is the baton he holds. One of his children was Joaquina Téllez-Girón, Marchioness of Santa Cruz, who was also portrayed by Goya. Another of the children from Goya's painting was known as Pedro de Álcantara Téllez-Girón y Pimentel, (1786–1851), Principe de Anglona, Captain General of the Island of Cuba from 10 January 1840 to 7 March 1841, and who was substituted by Jerónimo Valdés y Sierra (1784–1855), Captain General of the Island of Cuba from 7 March 1841 to 13 September 1843.

Images by Francisco Goya

Ancestors

References

Links

Bataille du Mas Deu le 17-18 Mai 1793, prats.fr; accessed 18 February 2015. 
Pedro de Alcantara Téllez-Girón y Pacheco, 9. duque de Osuna, geneall.net; accessed 18 February 2015.

Sources

1755 births
1807 deaths
Military personnel from Madrid
Pedro
Pedro
109
108
113
Knights of the Golden Fleece of Spain
Members of the Royal Spanish Academy
Spanish generals
Military leaders of the French Revolutionary Wars
Grandees of Spain
Nobility from Madrid
Place of death missing